Cempaka Putih Timur is an administrative village in the Cempaka Putih district, Central Jakarta, Indonesia. It has a postal code of 10510. The residential suburb of Cempaka Putih sprung up in the 1960s with the completion of Jakarta Bypass, the prototype of Jakarta Inner Ring Road.

See also
 List of administrative villages of Jakarta

References

Administrative villages in Jakarta
Cempaka Putih